Knut Reiersrud (born 12 February 1961) is a Norwegian blues guitarist. His work also incorporates elements of Norwegian traditional music and African music. Reiersrud has recorded and played with David Lindley, the Blind Boys Of Alabama, Rickie Lee Jones, Nina Hagen and Swedish blues musician Sven Zetterberg.  He has also numerous collaborations with Middle East performers like Rim Banna and Mahsa Vahdat. He lives in Oslo. He has collaborated extensively with the Norwegian organist Iver Kleive. He is lead guitarist and one of the original members of Cloudberry Cream.

Career 
Reiersrud also plays the harmonica, mandolin, langeleik, oud, and Turkish saz, he has composed music for four Norwegian movies, and together with Iver Kleive, took part in the opening ceremony of the '94 Olympic Winter Games.

In 2008 Reiersrud established his own festival «Trestock» at Nesodden, where a superteam of Norwegian musicians contributed. Among the artists can be mentioned Odd Nordstoga, Valkyrien Allstars and Reiersrud with his own K. R. Band, and in collaboration with organist Iver Kleive. Upcoming artists, exciting for the younger audience, include Jarle Bernhoft (ex «Span») with his new project; the band «Lester», composed of Nikolai Eilertsen (ex BigBang) and David Wallumrød; and the indie band «Maika». Other names include The Grand; Amund Maarud's rock band, Spellemannprisen nominated ; the girls who play lively frantic noise in Katzenjammer; the Rockabilly girls in Lucky Lips; the country artist Ivar Thomas; the Nesodden heroes «Foggy Boys» and «Midnight Special»; the traditional music trio «Vrang»; and «Drøbak Bluesband».

Reiersrud has for many years been host of the NRK radio program, Blues Asylet, together with Knut Borge. The program is meant to be a playground and a respite for blues and blues-friends of all shades. In 2004, Krissy Matthews undertook a radio session with Reiersrud for Blues Asylet on NRK P2.

Honors
1991: Spellemannprisen for the album Blå koral
1992: Gammleng-prisen in the class Studio
1995: Notodden Bluesfestivalpris
2004: Spellemannprisen for Pretty Ugly
2006: Danish Grammy for the tune "Nåde Over Nåde"

Discography

Solo albums 
1993 - Tramp (Kirkelig Kulturverksted), released in the U.S. in 1994 under the title Footwork
1995 - Klapp (Kirkelig Kulturverksted)
1998 - Soul of a Man (Kirkelig Kulturverksted)
1999 - Sub (Kirkelig Kulturverksted)
2001 - Sweet Showers of Rain (Kirkelig Kulturverksted)
2004 - Pretty Ugly (Kirkelig Kulturverksted)
2009 - Gitar (Big Dipper Records)
2013 - Aftonblues (Bluestown Records)
2015 - Tears Of The World (ACT Music), with Mighty Sam McClain
2018 -   Heat (Jazzland Recordings)

Collaborative works 
1982 - Rooster Blues (Hot Club Records), with «The Four Roosters»
1993 - Roots To Scandinavian Blues (Hot Club Records), with Nappy Brown
1991 - Blå koral (Kirkelig Kulturverksted), with Iver Kleive
1996 - Himmelskip (Kirkelig Kulturverksted), with Iver Kleive
2000 - Den Signede Dag (Kirkelig Kulturverksted), with Iver Kleive & Povl Dissing
2000 - 4G (Curling Legs), guitar album with Frode Alnæs, Knut Værnes & Bjørn Klakegg
2006 - Nåde For Nåde (Kirkelig Kulturverksted), with Iver Kleive
2011 - One Drop Is Plenty (Kirkelig Kulturverksted), with Mighty Sam McClain
2013 - Som Den Gylne Sol, with Iver Kleive and Povl Dissing
2014 - Blues Detour, with Eric Bibb and Ale Moeller
2015 - Trail of Souls, with Solveig Slettahjell and In the Country
2019 - Flying like Eagles (ACT), feat. Knut Reiersrud, Phil Donkin and Jim Black

References

External links 

Knut Reiersrud performing Scrapper Blackwell´s Back Door Blues on YouTube

1961 births
Living people
Fingerstyle guitarists
Norwegian blues guitarists
Oud players
Spellemannprisen winners
Musicians from Oslo
ACT Music artists
Jazzland Recordings (1997) artists